This article is about the particular significance of the year 1771 to Wales and its people.

Incumbents
Lord Lieutenant of Anglesey - Sir Nicholas Bayly, 2nd Baronet
Lord Lieutenant of Brecknockshire and Monmouthshire – Thomas Morgan of Rhiwpera (until 15 May) Charles Morgan of Dderw (from 23 December)
Lord Lieutenant of Caernarvonshire - Thomas Wynn
Lord Lieutenant of Cardiganshire – Wilmot Vaughan, 1st Earl of Lisburne
Lord Lieutenant of Carmarthenshire – George Rice
Lord Lieutenant of Denbighshire - Richard Myddelton  
Lord Lieutenant of Flintshire - Sir Roger Mostyn, 5th Baronet 
Lord Lieutenant of Glamorgan – Other Windsor, 4th Earl of Plymouth (until 21 April)
Lord Lieutenant of Merionethshire - William Vaughan
Lord Lieutenant of Montgomeryshire – Henry Herbert, 1st Earl of Powis 
Lord Lieutenant of Pembrokeshire – Sir William Owen, 4th Baronet
Lord Lieutenant of Radnorshire – Edward Harley, 4th Earl of Oxford and Earl Mortimer

Bishop of Bangor – John Ewer 
Bishop of Llandaff – Shute Barrington
Bishop of St Asaph – Jonathan Shipley
Bishop of St Davids – Charles Moss

Events
4 February - First meeting of the Cymdeithas y Gwyneddigion is held; Owen Jones is its president.
21 December - Sir Watkin Williams-Wynn, 4th Baronet, marries, as his second wife, Charlotte Grenville.

Arts and literature

New books
Henry Evans - Cynghorion Tad i'w Fab (translated from English) 
David Williams - The Philosopher, in Three Conversations

Music
Elis Roberts - Tair Rhan Oes Dyn
Peter Williams (1722-1796) - Hymns on Various Subjects (includes "Prayer for Strength", the first English translation of the hymn "Cwm Rhondda")

Births
14 May - Robert Owen, socialist businessman, founder of the cooperative movement (died 1858)
27 July - Simon Yorke, politician (died 1858)
date unknown - Hannibal Evans Lloyd, English-born translator of Welsh parentage (died 1847)

Deaths
21 April - Other Windsor, 4th Earl of Plymouth, Lord Lieutenant of Glamorgan, 39
15 May - Thomas Morgan (of Rhiwpera), politician, 43 
9 June - Richard Trevor, former bishop of St David's, 63
17 November - Lewis Hopkin, poet, 63
date unknown - Alban Thomas, physician

References

Wales
Wales